Dorothy Perpetua Wells (born Gatacre; 5 December 1971) is an English actress and writer.

She co-wrote and starred in the Sky Living series Doll & Em (2014–2015) with Emily Mortimer, and wrote and directed the 2019 comedy-drama Good Posture. Her other television work includes roles in Star Stories (2006–2008), Some Girls (2012–2014), Noel Fielding's Luxury Comedy (2012–2014), Blunt Talk (2015–2016), Dracula (2020), The Outlaws (2021) and Inside Man (2022).

Personal life
Wells was born Dorothy Gatacre, in Merton, London, the last of six children. She is the daughter of comic actor John Wells and Teresa Chancellor, daughter of Sir Christopher Chancellor, general manager of Reuters from 1944–59. Wells grew up thinking her father was her stepfather, and did not find out he was her biological father until she was eighteen. She later changed her name from Gatacre—her mother's first husband was Edward Gatacre—to Wells. Her first cousin is the actress Anna Chancellor.

She was educated in a Catholic convent school, after failing the entrance exam for St Paul's. While trying to build an acting career, she worked as a journalist at the Evening Standard and as a book reviewer.

Wells married photographer Mischa Richter in 2000. They have a daughter, Elsie (b. 2002) and a son, Ezra (b. 2005). Both appeared with their mother in Doll & Em.

Filmography

Films

Television

References

External links

 
 

1971 births
Living people
English television actresses
English film actresses
21st-century English actresses
Actresses from London
20th-century English actresses
London Evening Standard people